Aza Bridge is a 17th-century architectural monument in the village of Aza, Ordubad district. The bridge, which was partially reconstructed in 1997 and is still in active use, was an important trade route over the river Gilanchai in the time of Shāh Abbās of the Safavid dynasty.

See also
 Architecture of Azerbaijan

References

Bridges in Azerbaijan
Architecture in Azerbaijan
Tourist attractions in Azerbaijan